David Margolese (born October 24, 1957) is an Israeli entrepreneur, philanthropist, and co-founder of Sirius XM Radio, serving as chairman and CEO from 1993 to 2002. Considered "one of the earliest advocates of pay radio," he "effectively created the industry."

Early life
Margolese was born and raised in Vancouver, British Columbia. He attended the University of British Columbia, dropping out after one year. His father, Leonard, also dropped out of college, to sell television sets in the early 1950s, ultimately building a successful television store.

Cellular

Rogers Wireless
In 1978, at the age of 20, Margolese founded Canadian Telecom, a Vancouver-based radio paging company. He struggled in his early years as an entrepreneur. In 1980, he changed his company's focus to what would become the future cellular market. He prognosticated in his 1980 position paper, years before the commercial introduction of cellular and at a time when computers were in use by less than one percent of the public, that cellular "has the potential to become all pervasive." He also envisioned that it would "be used for much more" than just phone calls. When cell phones became widely available, it paid big dividends for Margolese. His company joined with Rogers Communications to form Cantel (a contraction of the name Canadian Telecom). Cantel would ultimately become Rogers Wireless, as of 2012 the largest cellular company in Canada, with over 9.3 million subscribers and revenues over $7 billion. Margolese cashed out of the company in 1989 to found his next venture.

Satellite radio

Sirius XM Radio
Following a brief, unsuccessful stint in Israel struggling to land a license for his new cellular consortium Teletec, Margolese moved to New York City in 1990 and purchased control of a newly formed venture named CD Radio Inc. He served as chairman and CEO of the satellite radio company. Margolese believed that, like cable TV, satellite radio would find an audience willing to pay for variety.

The primary obstacle faced by CD Radio and then Sirius was resistance from the Federal Communications Commission (FCC), who were under pressure from the National Association of Broadcasters, who felt threatened by the competition. In 1997, the FCC granted both CD Radio and XM Satellite Radio licenses to use a part of the S-band spectrum, costing CD Radio $83 million.

In 1999, Margolese changed the name of CD Radio to Sirius Satellite Radio, so as not to be identified with the outdated technology of compact discs. Margolese raised $1.8 billion to launch Sirius. Some of the money was obtained by gaining exclusive rights from Ford, Chrysler, BMW and Mercedes-Benz to feature Sirius in their automobiles.

Along with co-founder and former NASA engineer Robert Briskman, Margolese oversaw the development of the custom satellites, receivers and other technologies to bring satellite radio to consumers. Margolese also designed Sirius's $40 million headquarters at Rockefeller Center in Manhattan. According to Margolese, each satellite cost about a quarter-billion dollars to build, insure and launch. At the end of 2000, Sirius launched its third satellite into space, from the Baikonur Cosmodrome in Kazakhstan.

In November 2001, Margolese stepped down as CEO, remaining as chairman until November 2003, with Sirius issuing a statement thanking him "for his great vision, leadership and dedication in creating both Sirius and the satellite radio industry." Sirius acquired XM in 2008, becoming Sirius XM Radio. Through 2013, Sirius XM has reported 25.6 million subscribers, up 7% from the previous year, and revenues of $3.8 billion, up 12% from the previous year. In 2012, one of Sirius's original backup satellites, now decommissioned, was donated for display to the Smithsonian Institution's National Air and Space Museum.

Honors
Margolese was named one of ten finalists for the 1999 Entrepreneur of the Year by Harvard Business School. He was inducted into NASA's Space Technology Hall of Fame in 2002.

Personal life
In 2002, Margolese moved to Israel, fulfilling a lifelong dream.

References

Living people
1957 births
Businesspeople from Vancouver
Canadian Jews
Canadian radio executives
Canadian radio company founders
Canadian emigrants to Israel
Israeli Jews
Businesspeople in telecommunications
Rogers Communications
Sirius Satellite Radio
Sirius XM
University of British Columbia alumni